The MTV Video Music Awards Japan 2009 was broadcast the 8th annual awards show on Saturday, May 30, at the Saitama Super Arena in Saitama, Saitama. Gekidan Hitori was host the ceremony.

Awards 
Winners are in bold text.

Video of the Year
Exile — "Ti Amo (Chapter2)"
Namie Amuro — "New Look"
Coldplay — "Viva la Vida"
Southern All Stars — "I Am Your Singer"
Britney Spears — "Womanizer"

Album of the Year
Mr. Children — Supermarket Fantasy
Ayaka — Sing to the Sky
Coldplay — Viva La Vida or Death and All His Friends
Ne-Yo — Year of the Gentleman
Hikaru Utada — Heart Station

Best Male Video
Kreva — "Akasatanahamayarawawon"
Motohiro Hata — "Forever Song"
Ne-Yo — "Closer" 
Usher featuring Young Jeezy — "Love in This Club"
Kanye West — "Heartless"

Best Female Video 
Namie Amuro — "New Look" 
Thelma Aoyama — "Nando Mo"
Beyoncé — "If I Were a Boy" 
Britney Spears — "Womanizer" 
Hikaru Utada — "Prisoner of Love"

Best Group Video 
Exile — "Ti Amo (Chapter2)"
Franz Ferdinand — "Ulysses" 
The Killers — "Human" 
Shōnan no Kaze — "Koishigure" 
Tohoshinki — "Jumon (Mirotic)"

Best New Artist
Kimaguren — "Life"
Duffy — "Mercy" 
Girl Next Door — "Guzen no Kakuritsu" 
Miho Fukuhara — "Change"
Katy Perry — "I Kissed a Girl"

Best Rock Video
Maximum the Hormone — "Tsume Tsume Tsume"
9mm Parabellum Bullet — "Living Dying Message"
Acidman — "I Stand Free" 
Fall Out Boy — "I Don't Care"
Franz Ferdinand — "Ulysses"

Best Pop Video
Katy Perry — "I Kissed a Girl"
Lily Allen — "The Fear"
Ikimono-gakari — "Kimagure Romantic" 
Perfume — "Dream Fighter" 
Rip Slyme — "Taiyou to Bikini"

Best R&B Video
Namie Amuro — "Sexy Girl" 
Akon — "Right Now (Na Na Na)" 
Juju featuring Spontania — "Sunao ni Naretara"
Miliyah Kato — "19 Memories"
Ne-Yo — "Miss Independent"

Best Hip-Hop Video
Teriyaki Boyz featuring Busta Rhymes and Pharrell — "Zock On!" 
Kreva — "Akasatanahamayarawawon"
Lil' Wayne featuring Static Major — "Lollipop"
T.I. featuring Rihanna — "Live Your Life"
Kanye West — "Heartless"

Best Reggae Video
Han-Kun — "Hotter Than Hot"
Kardinal Offishall featuring Akon — "Dangerous" 
Mighty Jam Rock — "U.P. Star"
Natty — "Cold Town"
Ryo the Skywalker — "Ever Green"

Best Dance Video
Towa Tei featuring Miho Hatori — "Mind Wall"
The Brighton Port Authority featuring David Byrne and Dizzee Rascal — "Toe Jam"
Dan Le Sac vs. Scroobius Pip — "Thou Shalt Always Kill" 
Kraak & Smaak featuring Ben Westbeech — "Squeeze Me"
Ukawanimation! featuring Takkyū Ishino and Kenichi Hagiwara — "Wakusei no Portrait 5 Okuman Gaso"

Best Video from a Film
Remioromen — "Yume no Tsubomi" (from Kansen Retto)
Ai — "Okuribito" (from Departures)
Madonna featuring Justin Timberlake and Timbaland — "4 Minutes" (from Get Smart)
Monobright — "Ano Toumeikan to Shonen" (from After School)
Jack White and Alicia Keys — "Another Way to Die" (from Quantum of Solace)

Best Collaboration
Nelly and Fergie — "Party People"
Madonna featuring Justin Timberlake and Timbaland — "4 Minutes" 
Scha Dara Parr + Kaela Kimura — "Hey! Hey! Alright"
T.I. featuring Rihanna — "Live Your Life" 
Anna Tsuchiya featuring AI — "Crazy World"

Best Karaokee! Song
Kimaguren — "Life"
Aqua Timez — "Niji" 
Mariah Carey — "Touch My Body"
Coldplay — "Viva La Vida"
Funky Monkey Babys — "Kibou no Uta"

Special awards

MTV Street Icon Award
Beastie Boys

MTV Best Choreography Award
Exile

Live performances 
The Black Eyed Peas — "Boom Boom Pow"
BoA and Sean Garrett — "I Did It for Love"
Ciara — "Love Sex Magic"
Exile (featuring Bach Logic) — "Touch The Sky"
Green Day — "Know Your Enemy"
Katy Perry — "Hot n Cold"
Remioromen — "Sakura"
9mm Parabellum Bullet — "Living Dying Message"

Red carpet live 
AAA — "Jamboree!! / Music!!!" 
Kimaguren
Metro Station — "Shake It"

Guest celebrities 

Acidman
AI
Alan
Thelma Aoyama
Big Bang
Blue Man Group
DJ Caroline D'Amore
Crystal Kay
Cyril
Nana Eikura
Girl Next Door
Yuna Ito
DJ Kaori
Natsuki Katō

Kreva
Meisa Kuroki
Maximum the Hormone
Minmi
Nigo and Verbal (from Teriyaki Boyz)
Misako Sakazune
Shota Shimizu
Shōnan no Kaze
Special Others
Nana Tanimura
Triple H
Michelle McCool
W-inds
Kanako Yanagihara

See also 
50th Japan Record Awards

External links
MTV Video Music Awards Japan website

MTV
2009 in Japanese music